The forestry sector of Pakistan is a main source of lumber, paper, fuelwood, latex, medicine as well as food and provide ecotourism and wildlife conservation purposes. 4.91% of Pakistan's land is covered in forest.The Shangla district is the only district of Pakistan that composed of more than 80% of forest land

Statistics

The percentage of Pakistan's area that is forest is disputed. The UN's Food and Agriculture Organisation estimates 2.2% of the total land of Pakistan is covered by forests. On the contrary, Pakistan Forest Institute estimates it to be 5.1%. According to the survey done under the Red Plus programme in 2017, the forest cover of Pakistan is 5.7%.

According to survey under Red Plus programme, the Azad Jammu and Kashmir has the highest forest cover at 36.9%, followed by Khyber Pakhtunkhwa (20.3%), Islamabad (22.6%) and Federally Administered Tribal Areas (19.5%). The World Wild Fund report that between 2000 and 2010 Pakistan has lost 43,000 hectares of land every year.

Types

The coniferous forests occur from 1,000 to 4,000 m altitudes. Chitral, Swat, Upper Dir, Lower Dir, Malakand, Mansehra and Abbottabad districts of Khyber Pakhtunkhwa, Azad Kashmir and Rawalpindi district of the Punjab are the main areas covered with coniferous forests. Pindrow Fir (Abies pindrow), Morinda spruce (Picea smithiana), deodar (Cedrus deodara), blue pine (Pinus wallichiana), chir pine (Pinus roxburghii) are the most common varieties. The Coniferous forests also occur in Balochistan hills. Chilghoza pine (Pinus gerardiana) and juniper (Juniperus macropoda) are the two most common species of Balochistan.

The sub-tropical dry forests are found in the Attock, Rawalpindi, Islamabad, Jhelum and Gujrat districts of the Punjab, and in the Mansehra, Abbottabad, Mardan, Peshawar and Kohat districts of Khyber Pakhtunkhwa up to a height of 1,000 m. In Balochistan, they are confined to the Sulaiman Mountains and other hilly areas. Dominant tree species are phulai (Acacia modesta), kau (Olea cuspidata) and hopbush (Dodonaea viscosa).
The tropical thorn forests are dominated by xerophytic shrubs. They are most widespread in the Punjab plains but also occupy small areas in southern Sindh and western Balochistan. They are mainly used for grazing purposes, watershed protection and fuelwood. Common species are vann (Salvadora oleoides), khejri (Prosopis cineraria), kair (Capparis aphylla), etc.
The irrigated plantations were first developed in 1866 at Changa Manga in Lahore. Today they occupy about 226,000 ha. Sheesham (Dalbergia sissoo), mulberry/Shahtoot (Morus alba), babul (Acacia nilotica) and species of Eucalyptus and Populus are the common tree species grown in the irrigated plantations.
The riparian forests grow in narrow belts along the banks of River Indus and its tributaries. They are more commonly found in Sindh and to some extent in the Punjab. Babul (Acacia nilotica), Shisham (Dalbergia sissoo) and Tamarax dioica are the most common species. Khejri (Prosopis cineraria) and Populus euphratica are some other species. They are mainly used for lumber.
The mangrove wetlands are located in the Indus River Delta. Other saltwater wetlands are located on the coast of Balochistan such as at Sonmiani and Jiwani. These support mangrove forestry, mainly of species Avicennia marina as well as bamboo species and marsh grasses of Apluda and Cenchrus.

Uses
The forests of Pakistan are a main source of lumber, paper, fuelwood, latex, medicine as well as human and animal food. Other minor products include resin (a fluid in tissue of Chir pine plant that becomes solid on exposure to the air) and 'mazri' (used for making baskets). The forests also provide for ecotourism and wildlife conservation purposes. Forests have also been planted in some areas like Thal Desert to avoid soil erosion and further desertification. Riparian zone along the river Indus have been managed to avoid excess flooding.

Deforestation

According to the UN in 2011, Pakistan was the most heavily deforested country in Asia. The Federal Bureau of Statistics provisionally valued the deforestation sector at Rs.25,637 million in 2005, thus registering over 3% decline of forests in Pakistan since 2000. The main reasons of deforestation are urbanization, farming, overgrazing, and tourism development.

This has led to severe consequences such as desertification, flooding and endangering of wildlife. As a consequence to deforestation and changing land use patterns, the most critically affected ecosystems of Pakistan are:
Juniper forests of northern Baluchistan have been heavily harvested for timber and fuel wood.
Ecological changes in the Indus River riparian zone have drastically affected the riverine forests. Large tracts have been cleared for agriculture.
The Himalayan temperate forests are also under severe pressure from logging for timber and firewood, and from clearings for agriculture and human settlements.deforestation rate in Pakistan is increasing 0.2 to 0.5 percent annually

Conservation

The protected areas serve the purpose of conserving the forests and wildlife of Pakistan. National Conservation Strategy of 1993 was a major landmark of start of conservation of natural resources and wildlife in Pakistan. Resource-managed man-made forests like Changa Manga, Kamalia plantation and Chichawatni plantation have also been planted to serve purpose and conserve forests. Through conservation, a large region of Thal desert has been afforested.

Natural protected forests
Birir Valley Coniferous Forest in Chitral District (also called 'Deodar Chilghoza Oak Forest')
Jhangar Scrub Forest in Chakwal District
Sulaiman Coniferous Forest in Khyber Pukhtunkhwa (also called 'Sulaiman Chilgoza Pine Forest')
Ziarat Juniper Forest in Ziarat District

Artificial resource managed forests
Changa Manga Forest in Lahore District
Chichawatni Plantation in Sahiwal District
Khipro Reserve Forest in Sanghar District

Organizations

Research institutions

Shaheed Benazir Bhutto University, Sheringal, Upper Dir
Government College University Faisalabad, Faisalabad
Agricultural Research Institute, Quetta
Punjab Forest School, Bahawalpur 
Pakistan Forest Institute, Peshawar 
University of Agriculture, Peshawar 
Sindh Agriculture University, Hyderabad
University of Agriculture, Faisalabad 
University of Haripur, Haripur District 
Pir Mehr Ali Shah Arid Agriculture University, Rawalpindi
Institute of Agriculture Sciences and Forestry University of Swat, Swat District
Punjab Forestry Research Institutes, Gatwala Faisalabad
Punjab Wildlife Institutes Gatwala Faisalabad

Botanical gardens

Companies

See also

Agriculture in Pakistan
Ecoregions of Pakistan
Environmental issues in Pakistan
Ministry of Environment
Protected areas of Pakistan
Tourism in Pakistan
Wildlife of Pakistan
Forestry in India

References

Further reading
Jhangar, remains of the forest at wildlifeofpakistan.com
Forestry in Pakistan at pakistanpaedia.com

External links
Environment Protection Agency, Pakistan
Earth Trends - Forests of Pakistan

 
Tourism in Pakistan
Economy of Pakistan